Bekmūhammed Mūsaūly (December 1939 – 9 April 2017) was a Chinese politician of Kazakh ethnicity who served vice chairman of the Xinjiang Regional Committee of the Chinese People's Political Consultative Conference from 1998 to 2005, and governor of Ili Kazakh Autonomous Prefecture from 1993 to 1998.

Biography
Bekmūhammed Mūsaūly was born in Tekes County, Xinjiang, in December 1939. He entered the workforce in August 1965, and joined the Communist Party of China (CPC) in April 1971. In 1960, he enrolled in Beijing Normal University, majoring in chemistry. In February 1967, he entered Yili Kazakh Autonomous Prefecture Industry and Transportation Bureau, where he eventually became deputy director in April 1974. In September 1975, he was appointed head and deputy party secretary of Kuytun, and served for three years. In December 1978, he became deputy director of the Chemical Department of Xinjiang Uygur Autonomous Region, rising to director in June 1987. In May 1993, he took office as governor of Ili Kazakh Autonomous Prefecture, succeeding Alpısbaý Raxımulı. In January 1998, he was made vice chairman of the Xinjiang Regional Committee of the Chinese People's Political Consultative Conference, serving in the post until his retirement in June 2005.

On 9 April 2017, he died of an illness in Ürümqi, aged 77.

References

1939 births
2017 deaths
People from Tekes County
Beijing Normal University alumni
Ili Kazakh Autonomous Prefecture governors
People's Republic of China politicians from Xinjiang
Chinese Communist Party politicians from Xinjiang